The 2014 Atlantic 10 women's basketball tournament will be played March 5–9 at the Richmond Coliseum in Richmond, Virginia. This will be a 13 team Tournament with the addition of George Mason. The top 11 seeds will get the first round bye and the top 4 seeds will get the double bye. The 2014 championship game will be nationally televised on ESPNU. Fordham defeated Dayton 63-51 to win their first A-10 Tournament in school history. With that win, the Rams received the Atlantic 10 Conference's automatic bid to the NCAA Women's Tournament.

Seeds
Teams are seeded by record within the conference, with a tiebreaker system to seed teams with identical conference records.

Schedule

*Game times in Eastern Time. #Rankings denote tournament seeding.

Bracket

All times listed are Eastern

References

See also
2014 Atlantic 10 men's basketball tournament

2013–14 NCAA Division I women's basketball season
Atlantic 10 Women's Basketball
2014